The Gov. Abner Coburn House is a historic house on Main Street in Skowhegan, Maine.  Built in 1849 by a local master builder, it is one of the town's finest examples of Greek Revival architecture.  It was built for Skowhegan native Abner Coburn, one of its wealthiest citizens, who served one term as Governor of Maine.  The house was listed on the National Register of Historic Places in 1974.

Description and history
The Coburn House is a rectangular -story wood-frame structure with a front gable roof.  Its front facade is dominated by a two-story Greek temple front, with four fluted Ionic columns supporting an entablature and gabled pediment.  The pediment interior has two symmetrically placed sash windows.  The wall behind the temple front is flushboarded, with three bays of windows on each level, and a porch at the second level with a low balustrade. The main entrance to the house is on the right, in a projecting single-story rectangular block that includes flanking Ionic columns and pilasters on either side of the recessed doorway.  The building corners have paneled pilasters, which support a plain entablature that encircles the house below the roofline.

Abner Coburn was reported in 1882 to have a net worth of $6–7 million. He was involved in large-scale business endeavors, including the Maine Central Railroad, and sat on the boards of Colby College and the University of Maine. He served one term as Governor of Maine in 1863.

The builder of the Coburn House was Joseph Bigelow, a Skowhegan-based master builder with a statewide reputation.  Other notable buildings he worked in include the Samuel Farrar House in Bangor, and Skowhegan's 1844 brick First Baptist Church.  Bigelow hand-carved the columns and capitals found on this house.

See also
National Register of Historic Places listings in Somerset County, Maine

References

Houses on the National Register of Historic Places in Maine
Greek Revival houses in Maine
Houses completed in 1849
Houses in Somerset County, Maine
Buildings and structures in Skowhegan, Maine
1849 establishments in Maine
National Register of Historic Places in Somerset County, Maine